The Inter-American was a passenger train operated by Amtrak between Chicago and Laredo, Texas. Its route changed over time and was eventually replaced by the Texas Eagle.

History 
The Inter-American was established on January 27, 1973, with thrice-weekly service between Laredo and Fort Worth. At Fort Worth, travelers could connect with the Texas Chief, but doing so required an overnight layover. At Laredo, it was possible to cross the border to Nuevo Laredo, Mexico, and connect with Ferrocarriles Nacionales de México ("N de M") trains to points in Mexico.

In March 1974, the train was extended from Fort Worth to St. Louis via Dallas, following the route of the former Missouri Pacific Texas Eagle. From St. Louis, passengers could connect to Chicago.

In October 1976, Amtrak extended the Inter-American to Chicago. It operated daily between Chicago and St. Louis, but continued as thrice-weekly between St. Louis and Laredo.

On October 31, 1978, a St. Louis–Chicago Inter-American became the last train to serve Union Station in St. Louis.

In October 1979, budget cuts forced Amtrak to combine the Inter-American with the Chicago-Houston Lone Star (formerly the Texas Chief). The merged train retained the Inter-American name, changed from thrice-weekly to daily, and added a Houston section which split in Temple.

On October 1, 1981, Amtrak, once again forced to make service cuts, truncated the Inter-American to San Antonio and eliminated the Houston section. The new service was named the Eagle, and still runs today as the Texas Eagle.

See also 
 Texas Eagle

References

External links 
Photos of the Inter-American
1981 timetable

Railway services introduced in 1973
Former Amtrak routes
Passenger rail transportation in Arkansas
Passenger rail transportation in Illinois
Passenger rail transportation in Missouri
Passenger rail transportation in Texas
Railway services discontinued in 1981
Former long distance Amtrak routes